Simon Bækgaard  (born 14 October 1999) is a Danish professional football player who plays for FC Fredericia in the Danish 1st Division.

Career

Esbjerg fB
Bækgaard joined Esbjerg fB as a youth player from Spangsbjerg IF.

On 3 September 2017, Bækgaard got his official debut for Esbjerg in a Danish 1st Division game against Fremad Amager, where he played 62 minutes. In October 2017 Bækgaard got his contract extended once again, this time until June 2021, having already signed a 1-year contract thee months earlier. He played two league games in total in the 2017/18 season.

Bækgaard was permanently promoted into the first team squad from the 2018–19 season. In September 2018, Bækgaard scored a hattrick in the second round of the Danish Cup against Hørsholm IK. On 7 November 2018, he appeared as a substitute against fellow Superliga club SønderjyskE in the cup. He ended the season with four total appearances for Esbjerg.

Bækgaard failed to make any appearances for Esbjerg during first half of the 2019–20 season and was as a result loaned out to Danish third tier club Aarhus Fremad on 31 January 2020 for the remainder of the season. He made his debut on 7 March 2020, playing all 90 minutes against Dalum IF in a 2-0 win. On 24 June, he scored a brace as Fremad won 5–0 over Brønshøj.

After a terrible season at Esbjerg, which ended with relegation to the Danish 2nd Division, it was confirmed at the end of May 2022, that Bækgaard would leave the club at the end of the season, where his contract would expire.

FC Fredericia
On 30 May 2022 it was confirmed, that Bækgaard had signed a two-year deal with Danish 1st Division club FC Fredericia.

References

External links

Simon Bækgaard at Esbjerg fB's website

1999 births
Living people
Danish men's footballers
Esbjerg fB players
Aarhus Fremad players
FC Fredericia players
Danish 2nd Division players
Danish 1st Division players
Danish Superliga players
Association football midfielders